is a Japanese voice actress and narrator affiliated with Office Osawa. She is the regular dubbing voice actress for Halle Berry, Hilary Swank and Milla Jovovich (especially in Resident Evil film series). In 2006, Takako was chosen to succeed Atsuko Tanaka as Lara Croft in the Japanese dub of the Tomb Raider franchise, much like Atsuko, also eventually voicing the character in over five games.

Filmography

Television animation
2000
 Ghost Stories - Hajime Aoyama
 Hamtaro - Noppo-kun in Tottoko Hamutaro
2001
 Figure 17 - Shinji Ogawa
 Hikaru no Go - Yuri Hidaka
2002
 Tokyo Mew Mew - Sakura Momomiya, Tomoya
2003
 Godannar - Kiriko Aoi
 Naruto - Anko Mitarashi
2004
 Bleach - Jinta Hanakari
 Tweeny Witches - Barunn, Hata
2005
 Cyborg 009 - Child Joe Shimamura
 Jigoku Shoujo - Hone-Onna
 Speed Grapher - Hibari Ginza
 Trinity Blood - Cardinal Caterina Sforza
2006
 Bleach - Dalk (Doll)
 Nana - Junko Saotome
2007
 D.Gray-man - Mahoja
 Darker than Black - April
 Naruto Shippuden - Anko Mitarashi
 Tengen Toppa Gurren Lagann - Gimmy and Leite
 Pokémon Diamond and Pearl - Pokémon Hunter J
2009
 Fullmetal Alchemist: Brotherhood - Martel
2010
 Cobra the Animation - Pamela Lee
 Marvel Anime: Iron Man - Chika Tanaka
2011
 Deadman Wonderland - Chief Guard Makina
 Hanasaku Iroha - Satsuki Matsumae
 Wandering Son - Hiroyuki Yoshida / Yuki
2014
 Cross Ange - Jill / Alektra Maria von Loewenherz
2017
 Boruto: Naruto Next Generations - Anko Mitarashi
2018
 Killing Bites - Kaede Kazama
2019
 Fairy Tail - Irene Belserion
2020
 Great Pretender - Farrah Brown
2021
Those Snow White Notes - Umeko Sawamura
My Hero Academia Season 5 - Chitose Kizuki
Ranking of Kings - Shiina
Blade Runner: Black Lotus - Alani Davis

Unknown date
Bleach (Uryū Ishida (young))
Mirmo! (Kuroro)
Naruto Shippuden (Anko Mitarashi)
Saint Seiya: The Lost Canvas (Behemoth Violate)
Tsubasa Chronicle (Ashura)

Theatrical animation
Dead Leaves (Pandy)
Kara no Kyōkai (movies) (Toko Aozaki)

Original net animation
Cyberpunk: Edgerunners (2022) (Kiwi)

Video games
Radiant Silvergun (1998) (Operator 2)
Front Mission 5: Scars of the War (2005) (Lynn Wenright)
Rogue Galaxy (2005) (Fable and Angela Seas)
Valkyrie Profile 2: Silmeria (2006) (Iseria Queen)
Tomb Raider: Legend (2006) (Lara Croft)
Tomb Raider: Anniversary (2007) (Lara Croft)
Odin Sphere (2007) (Elfaria and Odette)
Soulcalibur IV (2008) (Angol Fear, Shura)
Tomb Raider: Underworld (2008) (Lara Croft)
Fallout: New Vegas (2010) (Rose of Sharon Cassidy)
Lara Croft and the Guardian of Light (2010) (Lara Croft)
Asura's Wrath (2012) (Olga)
Epic Seven (2018) (Aramintha, Silver Blade Aramintha)

Drama CD
Ambassador wa Yoru ni Sasayaku (????) (Caroline)
GetBackers (????) (Dokubachi)
Onimusha: Dawn of Dreams (????) (Shinobu Wind Demon #2)
Princess Princess (????) (Mikoto Yutaka)
Soul Eater (Vol. 1): Special Social Studies Field Trip (????) (Death the Kid)

Dubbing roles

Live-action
Milla Jovovich
The Claim (Lucia)
No Good Deed (Erin)
Resident Evil (Alice)
You Stupid Man (Nadine)
Resident Evil: Apocalypse (Alice)
.45 (Kat)
Ultraviolet (Violet Song Jat Shariff)
Resident Evil: Extinction (Alice)
The Fourth Kind (Dr. Abigail "Abbey" Tyler)
A Perfect Getaway (Cydney)
Resident Evil: Afterlife (Alice)
Stone (Lucetta)
Faces in the Crowd (Anna Merchant)
Resident Evil: Retribution (Alice)
Cymbeline (Queen)
Survivor (Kate Abbott)
Resident Evil: The Final Chapter (Alice)
Shock and Awe (Vlatka Landay)
Hellboy (Vivienne Nimue, the Blood Queen)
Monster Hunter (Captain Natalie Artemis)
Halle Berry
Die Another Day (Giacinta 'Jinx' Johnson)
Gothika (Dr. Miranda Grey)
X2 (Ororo Munroe / Storm)
Catwoman (Patience Phillips / Catwoman)
X-Men: The Last Stand (Ororo Munroe / Storm)
Perfect Stranger (Rowena Price)
Cloud Atlas (Jocasta Ayrs/Luisa Rey/Ovid/Meronym/Native Woman/Indian Party Guest)
The Call (Jordan Turner)
X-Men: Days of Future Past (Ororo Munroe / Storm)
Kidnap (Karla Dyson)
Kingsman: The Golden Circle (Ginger Ale)
John Wick: Chapter 3 – Parabellum (Sofia)
Moonfall (Jocinda Fowler)
Charlize Theron
Head in the Clouds (Gilda Bessé)
North Country (Josey Aimes)
The Burning Plain (Sylvia)
Hancock (Mary Embrey)
Prometheus (2017 The Cinema edition) (Meredith Vickers)
A Million Ways to Die in the West (Anna Barnes-Leatherwood)
Mad Max: Fury Road (Imperator Furiosa)
Dark Places (Libby Day)
Atomic Blonde (Lorraine Broughton)
Tully (Marlo Moreau)
Bombshell (Megyn Kelly)
The Old Guard (Andy)
Hilary Swank
Boys Don't Cry (Brandon Teena)
The Affair of the Necklace (Jeanne de Saint-Rémy de Valois)
Insomnia (Ellie Burr)
Million Dollar Baby (Margaret "Maggie" Fitzgerald)
The Black Dahlia (Madeleine Linscott)
P.S. I Love You (Holly Kennedy)
New Year's Eve (Nurse Aimee)
I Am Mother (Woman)
The Hunt (Athena Stone)
Rosario Dawson
25th Hour (Naturelle Riviera)
The Adventures of Pluto Nash (Dina Lake)
Men in Black II (Laura Vasquez)
Sin City (Gail)
Seven Pounds (Emily Posa)
Unstoppable (Connie Hooper)
The Captive (Nicole Dunlop)
Sin City: A Dame to Kill For (Gail)
Cobie Smulders
The Avengers (Maria Hill)
Safe Haven (Carly / Jo)
Delivery Man (Emma)
Captain America: The Winter Soldier (Maria Hill)
Avengers: Age of Ultron (Maria Hill)
Jack Reacher: Never Go Back (Major Susan Turner)
Avengers: Infinity War (Maria Hill)
Spider-Man: Far From Home (Maria Hill)
Jessica Biel
The Texas Chainsaw Massacre (Erin Hardesty)
Blade: Trinity (2007 TV Tokyo edition) (Abigail Whistler)
Home of the Brave (SGT Vanessa Price)
I Now Pronounce You Chuck and Larry (Alex McDonough)
Valentine's Day (Kara Monahan)
Total Recall (Melina)
The Sinner (Cora Tannetti)
Sandra Bullock
Divine Secrets of the Ya-Ya Sisterhood (Siddalee "Sidda" Walker)
The Lake House (Doctor Kate Forster)
Extremely Loud & Incredibly Close (Linda Schell)
The Heat (Sarah Ashburn)
Ocean's 8 (Debbie Ocean)
Bird Box (Malorie Hayes)
The Lost City (Loretta Sage)
Michelle Monaghan
Eagle Eye (Rachel Holloman)
Machine Gun Preacher (Lynn Childers)
The Best of Me (Amanda Collier)
Pixels (Lieutenant Colonel Violet Van Patten)
The Vanishing of Sidney Hall (Velouria Hall)
Elizabeth Banks
The 40-Year-Old Virgin (Beth)
Slither (Starla Grant)
Role Models (Beth Willett)
Definitely, Maybe (Emily Jones)
The Next Three Days (Lara Brennan)
Jada Pinkett Smith
The Matrix Reloaded (Niobe)
The Matrix Revolutions (Niobe)
Hawthorne (Christina Hawthorne)
Gotham (Maria Mercedes "Fish" Mooney)
The Matrix Resurrections (Niobe)
2046 (Wang Jing-wen (Faye Wong))
3 Ninjas: High Noon at Mega Mountain (Jeffrey "Colt" Douglas (Michael O'Laskey II))
The 355 (Graciela Rivera (Penélope Cruz))
Alien vs. Predator (Alexa Woods (Sanaa Lathan))
Alita: Battle Angel (Gelda (Michelle Rodriguez))
Alvin and the Chipmunks: The Squeakquel (Jeanette (Anna Faris))
Alvin and the Chipmunks: Chipwrecked (Jeanette (Anna Faris))
American Outlaws (Zee Mimms (Ali Larter))
Anatomy (Gretchen (Anna Loos))
Andromeda (Andromeda Ascendant, Rommie (Lexa Doig))
Angel-A (Angela (Rie Rasmussen))
Anna Magdalena (Mok Man-yee (Kelly Chen))
Annie (Miss Colleen Hannigan (Cameron Diaz))
Another Life (Niko Breckinridge (Katee Sackhoff))
The Astronaut's Wife (Nan (Clea DuVall))
Bad Boys II (Special Agent Sydney "Syd" Burnett (Gabrielle Union))
Battlestar Galactica (Lieutenant Kara "Starbuck" Thrace (Katee Sackhoff))
Beautiful Boy (Karen Barbour-Sheff (Maura Tierney))
Bionic Woman (Sarah Corvus (Katee Sackhoff))
Blindspot (Remi "Jane Doe" Briggs (Jaimie Alexander))
Brain Games (Tiffany Haddish)
Bring It On (Isis (Gabrielle Union))
Bruce Almighty (Susan Ortega (Catherine Bell))
The Cave (Charlie (Piper Perabo))
The Chronicles of Riddick (Jack / Kyra (Alexa Davalos))
Clash of the Titans (2012 TV Asahi edition) (Io (Gemma Arterton))
Contagion (Elizabeth Emhoff (Gwyneth Paltrow))
Crazy, Stupid, Love (Robbie (Jonah Bobo))
Dark Kingdom: The Dragon King (Brunhild (Kristanna Loken))
The Dark Knight (Rachel Dawes (Maggie Gyllenhaal))
Day of the Dead (2020 Blu-ray edition) (Dr. Sarah Bowman (Lori Cardille))
The Departed (Dr. Madolyn Madden (Vera Farmiga))
Devour (Dakota (Dominique Swain))
Diary of the Dead (Debra Moynihan (Michelle Morgan))
Dune (Dr. Liet-Kynes (Sharon Duncan-Brewster))
Enter the Fat Dragon (Chloe Song / Chloe Zhu (Niki Chow))
Exit Speed (Corporal Meredith Cole (Julie Mond))
The Faculty (Stokely "Stokes" Mitchell (Clea DuVall))
Falling Skies (Anne Glass-Mason (Moon Bloodgood))
The Family Stone (Julie Morton (Claire Danes))
Fast & Furious (2011 TV Asahi edition) (Letty Ortiz (Michelle Rodriguez))
Frankenfish (Eliza (K. D. Aubert))
G-Force (Juarez (Penélope Cruz))
Game of Thrones (Cersei Lannister (Lena Headey))
Gamer (Angie "Nika" Roth Tillman (Amber Valletta))
Gia (Gia Carangi (Angelina Jolie))
The Gifted (Reeva Payge (Grace Byers))
Girl, Interrupted (Georgina Tuskin (Clea DuVall))
The Golden Compass (Serafina Pekkala (Eva Green))
Gone Girl (Margo "Go" Dunne (Carrie Coon))
Gridlock'd (Barbara "Cookie" Cook (Thandie Newton))
Halo (Riz-028 (Natasha Culzac))
Hannah Montana: The Movie (Tyra Banks)
Harper's Island (Abby Mills (Elaine Cassidy))
Heidi (Rottenmeier (Katharina Schüttler))
Hellboy (Liz Sherman (Selma Blair))
Hellboy II: The Golden Army (Liz Sherman (Selma Blair))
Henry's Crime (Julie Ivanova (Vera Farmiga))
Hwang Jini (Hwang Jini (Ha Ji-won))
Indiana Jones and the Kingdom of the Crystal Skull (Colonel-Doctor Irina Spalko (Cate Blanchett))
Jay and Silent Bob Strike Back (Justice (Shannon Elizabeth))
John Q. (2007 NTV edition) (Denise Archibald (Kimberly Elise))
Just like Heaven (Elizabeth Masterson (Reese Witherspoon))
L.A.'s Finest (Special Agent Sydney "Syd" Burnett (Gabrielle Union))
Liar (Katy Sutcliffe (Zoë Tapper))
Limitless (FBI Special Agent Rebecca Harris (Jennifer Carpenter))
The Lord of the Rings: The Two Towers (Éowyn (Miranda Otto))
The Lord of the Rings: The Return of the King (Éowyn (Miranda Otto))
Lucifer ("Mum" / Goddess (Tricia Helfer))
Man on Fire (Lisa Ramos (Radha Mitchell))
Matilda the Musical (Mrs Phelps (Sindhu Vee))
Mesrine (Jeanne Schneider (Cécile de France))
A Mighty Heart (Mariane Pearl (Angelina Jolie))
The Monkey King (Guan Yin (Kelly Chen))
The Monkey King 2 (Guan Yin (Kelly Chen))
Night at the Museum: Secret of the Tomb (Sacagawea (Mizuo Peck))
Obsessed (Lisa Sheridan (Ali Larter))
Painkiller Jane (Jane Vasco (Kristanna Loken))
Pepper Dennis (Pepper Dennis (Rebecca Romijn))
The Perfect Guy (Leah Vaughn (Sanaa Lathan))
Personal Shopper (Lara (Sigrid Bouaziz))
Phone Booth (Kelly Shepard (Radha Mitchell))
Pirates of the Caribbean: On Stranger Tides (Angelica (Penélope Cruz))
Police Story (2012 Ultimate Blu-Ray edition) (Selina Fong (Brigitte Lin))
Primeval (Aviva Masters (Brooke Langton))
Prison Break (Sara Tancredi (Sarah Wayne Callies))
Private Practice (Charlotte King (KaDee Strickland))
The Protector (Laura Shapiro (Saun Ellis))
The Purge (Mary Sandin (Lena Headey))
Railroad Tigers (Yuko (Zhang Lanxin))
Rampage (Dr. Kate Caldwell (Naomie Harris))
REC (Ángela Vidal (Manuela Velasco))
REC 2 (Ángela Vidal (Manuela Velasco))
The Recruit (Layla Moore (Bridget Moynahan))
Ring Around the Rosie (Wendy Baldwin (Jenny Mollen))
Roman J. Israel, Esq. (Maya Alston (Carmen Ejogo))
Scott Pilgrim vs. the World (Ramona Flowers (Mary Elizabeth Winstead))
Secret Garden (Gil Ra-im (Ha Ji-won))
The Secret Life of Bees (June Boatwright (Alicia Keys))
The Seeker: The Dark Is Coming (Will Stanton (Alexander Ludwig))
Shark Lake (Meredith Hernandez (Sara Malakul Lane))
Shaun of the Dead (Liz (Kate Ashfield))
Shiri (Lee Myung-hyun/Lee Bang-hee (Yunjin Kim))
Six Feet Under (Brenda Chenowith (Rachel Griffiths))
Skiptrace (Dasha (Eve Torres))
Snakehead Swamp (Carley (Terri Garber))
A Sound of Thunder (Jenny Krase (Jemima Rooper))
The Staircase (Kathleen Peterson (Toni Collette))
Star Trek: Enterprise (T'Pol (Jolene Blalock))
Stick It (Haley Graham (Missy Peregrym))
S.W.A.T. (Captain Jessica Cortez (Stephanie Sigman))
Taxi (Lieutenant Marta Robbins (Jennifer Esposito))
Terminator 3: Rise of the Machines (2005 NTV edition) (T-X (Kristanna Loken))
The Thing (Kate Lloyd (Mary Elizabeth Winstead))
The Third Man (New Era Movies edition) (Anna Schmidt (Alida Valli))
Third Person (Monika (Moran Atias))
Thirteen Ghosts (Kathy Kriticos (Shannon Elizabeth))
Those Who Wish Me Dead (Hannah (Angelina Jolie))
Tokyo Raiders (Macy (Kelly Chen))
Top Gun: Maverick (Penelope "Penny" Benjamin (Jennifer Connelly))
Trash (Gardo (Eduardo Luis))
The Tuxedo (Steena (Debi Mazar))
V.I.P. (Vallery Irons (Pamela Anderson))
The Voices (Fiona (Gemma Arterton))
Weird Science (Lisa (Kelly LeBrock))
White House Down (Carol Finnerty (Maggie Gyllenhaal))
xXx (J.J. (Eve))
Years and Years (Celeste Bisme-Lyons (T'Nia Miller))
Zombieland: Double Tap (Wichita (Emma Stone))

Animation
Buzz Lightyear of Star Command (Mira Nova)
Epic (Queen Tara)
Ferdinand (Lupe)
Kung Fu Panda 3 (Master Tigress)
Mars Needs Moms (Milo's Mother)
Meet the Robinsons (Franny)
My Little Pony: The Movie (Princess Luna)
Puss in Boots (Kitty Softpaws)
Turbo (Paz)
Star Wars: Droids (2005 DVD edition) (Jessica Meade)

References

External links
  
 

1972 births
Living people
Japanese video game actresses
Japanese voice actresses
Voice actresses from Tokyo
20th-century Japanese actresses
21st-century Japanese actresses